Adil Takhssait, better known by his stage names Vaï, also Mélo or Mélopsy, is a Canadian rap and hip hop musician of Moroccan origin. Adil Takhssait was born 24 April 1979 in Paris, France, in a Moroccan family and immigrated to Canada in 1993, and established himself in Montreal. He is an author, composer and performer. He is signed to K.Pone.Inc record label.

In LMDS

Adil Takhssait formed in 1994 his first band LMDS abbreviation of Les Messagers Du Son with his classmate and friend Cyril Kamar (later on K'Maro). Adil took the name "Mélo" (Mélopsy) whereas Cyril Kamar took the name Lyrik.

LMDS, Les Messagers du Son, has had two successful albums, Les Messagers du Son in 1997 and Il Faudrait Leur Dire in 1999. The self-titled debut album of LMDS Les Messagers du Son issued in 1997 achieved top positions in the Quebec charts and the duo appeared at Les FrancoFolies de Montréal music festival in 1999. They followed that by "Il faudrait leur dire" and a compilation released in France, where both had resided for some time.

After the break-up of the group in 2001, both Adil Takhssait and Cyril Kamar have continued with solo careers

Vaï, as a solo act
Soon after the break-up, Adil issued his solo breakthrough album Street Life through THC Musique with the title track single coming from the album. The song "Street Life" featured Zaho and sampled on "Sweet Dreams (Are Made of This)" from Eurythmics.

The single "Tous Héros" about violence and boxing gained cult status amongst fans. The song sampled on James Brown hit "It's a Man's Man's Man's World".

His follow-up album Ma raison in 2008 included the single "Sur ma vie" and the music video featured in the daily Top 5 chart in Canadian French language cable television specialty channel MusiMax

He was also featured in Zoxea's song "Reste calme" and in DJ Blast's "Un homme à part".

His "Visages tristes" is about the Arab-Israeli conflict using samplings from the soundtrack of Schindler's List.

Personal life
Vaï is married to a professional photographer and has a son with her. During his hiatus from rapping, he opened a burger business under the name Vaï Burger in Laval and in Ville Saint-Laurent, Quebec.

Albums & EPs

With LMDS
1997: Les Messagers du Son 
1999: Il Faudrait Leur Dire

As solo act

Singles

With LMDS
"Cette une belle histoire" (with Jodie Resther)
"Joins toi à la dance"
"Tu me dirais"
"Le bien de demain"
"La Squadra"

As solo act
"Street Life" featuring Zaho (2004)
"Sur ma vie" (2008)
"Infidèle" (2009)
"À zéro" (2019)
"Corrida" (2019)
"Sous la pluie" (2019)
"Revolver" (2019)
"Suffoque" (2020)
"Namek" (2020)
"HEAVEN" (2020)

References

External links
 Vaï YouTube
 MySpace site

1979 births
Canadian male rappers
Canadian male singers
French emigrants to Canada
French emigrants to Quebec
French-language singers of Canada
Living people
Moroccan emigrants to Canada
Singers from Montreal
20th-century Canadian rappers
21st-century Canadian rappers
20th-century Canadian male musicians
21st-century Canadian male musicians